Isasca is a comune (municipality) in the Province of Cuneo in the Italian region Piedmont, located about  southwest of Turin and about  northwest of Cuneo, in the Valle Varaita.

Isasca borders the following municipalities: Brondello, Brossasco, Martiniana Po, and Venasca.

References 

Cities and towns in Piedmont